Tantsy Minus is a Russian rock band founded in 1995 by .

The group has won the Golden Gramophone Award three times (2000, 2001, 2009).

References

External links

 Official Website
 

Russian rock music groups
Musical groups established in 1995
Musical groups from Moscow
Musical groups from Saint Petersburg
Winners of the Golden Gramophone Award